Loïc Dufau (born 15 March 1989) is a French professional footballer who plays as a midfielder for GOAL FC.

Career
Dufau started his career with Monaco, where he made 59 league appearances for the reserve team, and also had a loan spell at Championnat National side Cassis Carnoux during the 2009–10 season.

Dufau was a regular starter in the Gazélec Ajaccio team that won promotion to Ligue 2 for the first time in the club's history in 2012.

On 7 August 2015, it was announced that Dufau had signed for Bulgarian club Lokomotiv Plovdiv, signing a 1-year contract. He made his A Group debut on the following day against Litex Lovech.

On 8 July 2022, Dufau signed with Championnat National 2 club GOAL FC.

Honours 
Le Puy

 Championnat National 2: 2021–22

References

External links

Loïc Dufau career statistics at foot-national.com

1989 births
Living people
Footballers from Marseille
French footballers
Association football midfielders
AS Monaco FC players
SO Cassis Carnoux players
Gazélec Ajaccio players
PFC Lokomotiv Plovdiv players
CS Sedan Ardennes players
SC Toulon players
Le Puy Foot 43 Auvergne players
GOAL FC players
Championnat National players
Championnat National 2 players
Championnat National 3 players
Ligue 2 players
First Professional Football League (Bulgaria) players
Expatriate footballers in Bulgaria